Gardenton is a community in the Canadian province of Manitoba.

References 

Unincorporated communities in Eastman Region, Manitoba